Rockin' with the Rhythm is the second studio album by American country music duo The Judds, released on October 30, 1985, by RCA Nashville. It features the singles "Have Mercy," "Grandpa (Tell Me 'Bout the Good Old Days)," "Rockin' with the Rhythm of the Rain" and "Cry Myself to Sleep"; all four singles reached #1 on Billboard's Hot Country Singles & Tracks chart.

The album has been certified Platinum by the RIAA for sales of 1 million copies. It was named the Top Country Album of 1986 by Billboard, and was nominated for Favorite Country Album at the 1987 American Music Awards.

Track listing

Personnel

The Judds
 Naomi Judd - vocals
 Wynonna Judd - vocals

Additional Musicians
 Eddie Bayers - drums
 Mark Casstevens - acoustic guitar
 Sonny Garrish - dobro, pedal steel guitar
 Bobby Ogdin - piano
 Don Potter - acoustic guitar, electric guitar
 David Schnaufer - dulcimer, jew's harp
 Gene Sisk - piano
 Jack Williams - bass guitar

Charts

Weekly charts

Year-end charts

References 

1985 albums
Curb Records albums
The Judds albums
RCA Records albums
Albums produced by Brent Maher